Laemmle may refer to:
 Carl Laemmle (1867–1939), film producer
 Carl Laemmle Jr. (1908–1979), film producer
 Carla Laemmle (1909–2014), dancer and actress
 Ernst Laemmle (1900–1950), film director
 Edward Laemmle (1887–1937), film director
 Laemmle Theatres Los Angeles, Calif. U.S.A.